Bohuslavka may refer to the following places in Ukraine: 

 Bohuslavka, Izium Raion, Kharkiv Oblast
 Bohuslavka, Synelnykove Raion, Dnipropetrovsk Oblast

See also
 Maria Bohuslavka